Monkeypaw Productions is an American film and television production company founded in 2012 by Jordan Peele. The company is known for producing horror films, such as Get Out, Us, Candyman, Nope and Wendell & Wild. In 2019, the company signed a 5-year exclusivity deal with Universal Pictures.

Overview
In 2012, Monkeypaw Productions released the comedy series Key & Peele on January 31, 2012 on Comedy Central. When the series ended in 2015, Jordan Peele and Keegan-Michael Key wrote the script for the comedy film Keanu which was released on April 29, 2016 by New Line Cinema and Warner Bros. Pictures.

In November 2015, it was reported that Henry Selick was developing Wendell & Wild, a stop-motion adult animated feature based on an unpublished book by Selick and Clay McLeod Chapman. The film was set to star Key and Peele, the latter also being a writer and producer on the film. In March 2018, the film was picked up by Netflix. The film premiered at Toronto International Film Festival on September 11, 2022 and was later released in theaters on October 21.

Jordan Peele's directorial debut horror film Get Out was released on February 24, 2017, produced by Monkeypaw and distributed by Universal Pictures. Following the success of the film, Peele signed a two year, first-look deal with Universal. The deal was made with the intention of highlighting stories and creatives from marginalized communities.

On May 16, 2017, it was announced that the company and J. J. Abrams's Bad Robot Productions were producing a horror television series titled Lovecraft Country for HBO and Warner Bros. Television Studios. The series was based on and served as a continuation of the 2016 novel of the same name by Matt Ruff. The pilot was written by Misha Green, who served as the showrunner for the series. Peele, Abrams and Ben Stephenson served as executive producers.

On May 8, 2018, it was announced that Peele would write and direct Us, a social horror film starring Lupita Nyong'o, Elisabeth Moss and Winston Duke. The film was released on March 22, 2019 by Universal Pictures. In 2019, Us was featured in a maze for Universal's Halloween Horror Nights and in 2022 as part of the terror tram with Nope.

In September 2021, Monkeypaw and Peele signed a multiyear TV deal with Universal Studio Group ending a previous first-look deal with Amazon Studios. The deal brought both film and television output under a partnership with Universal.

In 2022, the original set of Jupiter's Claim, the fictional theme park featured in Peele's third directorial film Nope, was added permanently as a part of Universal Studios Hollywood's Studio Tour on July 22. The set became the first Studio Tour attraction to open the same day as a film's release.

Feature films

Films

Upcoming films

In development

Short films

Television series

Podcasts

Books

References

External links
 

Mass media companies established in 2012
Film production companies of the United States